Haviv elementary school (Hebrew: בית הספר חביב) is the first Hebrew school in the world. 

It was established in 1886 in Rishon LeZion and is still active to this day.

History 
Ever since the establishment of Rishon LeZion the question of education for the children of the village was raised. In 1882, when the village was established, Aharon Mordehai Freiman invited a Melamed from Hebron named Rappaport Tuvia Haim in which he taught the boys of the village in a tent in his yard. He taught Torah, Mishnah and Talmud while they were sitting on the floor around a low table. Later their place of study was moved to the basements of the founders of the village Shraga Fayvel and Dov Fishelzon, Math. The French language was also added to the curriculum.

In 1886, the population of Rishon LeZion was about 300, of which several dozen were children who needed proper education, so the establishment of a modern school was proposed. However, this was difficult due to the lack of experienced teachers, the lack of textbooks in Hebrew and mixed gender education which was not yet accepted.

The school was established in the center of Rishon LeZion near the great synagogue for girls only. The boys studied in the basement of the synagogue. The school had no name and was simply known as "The school". Mordechai Lubman was appointed the school's first principal by the baron's clerks. 

Many teachers of the time wrote textbooks themselves due to the lack of textbooks in Hebrew. The teachers had to create new words in Hebrew for tools and terms that did not exist at the time of the Bible. The "reviver of the Hebrew language" Eliezer Ben-Yehuda was a teacher in the school and wrote textbooks as well. Because the school taught exclusively in Hebrew, it is considered the world's first school to teach in Hebrew. 

In 1901, the principal Israel Belkind decided to allow the school to teach both boys and girls.

In 1920, the school was named "Haviv School", named after Dov Lubman Haviv, who was the former chairman of the local council of Rishon LeZion.

See also 
 Herzliya Hebrew Gymnasium
Education in Israel

References

External links 
 

Schools in Israel
Yishuv
Rishon LeZion
1886 establishments